Ego Brønnum-Jacobsen (24 March 1905 – 25 March 1978) was a Danish film actor. He appeared in 30 films between 1942 and 1974. He was born in Copenhagen, Denmark and died in Denmark.

Filmography

 Syg og munter (1974)
 Mindesmærket (1972)
 Rektor på sengekanten (1972)
 Pelsen (1971)
 Olsen-banden (1968)
 Mig og min lillebror (1967)
 Landsbylægen (1961)
 Mine tossede drenge (1961)
 Komtessen (1961)
 Panik i paradis (1960)
 Paw (1959)
 Vi er allesammen tossede (1959)
 Mariannes bryllup (1958)
 Laan mig din kone (1957)
 Mig og min familie (1957)
 Kristiane af Marstal (1956)
 Bruden fra Dragstrup (1955)
 Det er så yndigt at følges ad (1954)
 Dorte (1951)
 Mød mig paa Cassiopeia (1951)
 Unge piger forsvinder i København (1951)
 Op og ned langs kysten (1950)
 Shakespeare og Kronborg (1950)
 Lyn-fotografen (1950)
 De pokkers unger (1947)
 Lykke på rejsen (1947)
 Baby på eventyr (1942)
 Vi kunde ha' det saa rart (1942)
 Natekspressen P903 (1942)
 Ta' briller på (1942)

External links

1905 births
1978 deaths
Danish male film actors
Male actors from Copenhagen
20th-century Danish male actors